SS Maid of Kent was a British passenger ferry and later converted to a hospital ship. She was named after Elizabeth Barton.

Construction and career 

She was laid down, launched and commissioned in 1925. She was owned by Southern Railway Company, London. 26 October, she was delivered to Southampton. SS Maid of Kent replaced her sister ship Isle of Thanet which was transferred to Folkestone on 6 November.

On 9 March 1926, she accidentally rammed the Southern Breakwater at Dover which cause damage to her bow.

SS Maid of Kent made her way to Folkestone as soon the United Kingdom declared war on Germany. She was taken over by the Royal Navy and designated as a hospital ship and made her way from Newhaven to Dieppe.

Throughout the May of 1940, she made several trips to and back carrying hundreds of wounded. 18 May, a bomb dropped nearby of HMHS Maid of Kent but she was unable to relocate,  three days later on 21 May, a bomb from the Luftwaffe air raid hit her engine room which cause a fire aboard the ship. She sank that day but was later raised by the Germans and moved into deeper water.

Gallery

References

Hospital ships
1925 ships
Hospital ships in World War II